Lucia Reining (born 13 September 1961) is a German theoretical spectroscopist who works in France as a director of research (exceptional class) with the French National Centre for Scientific Research (CNRS), in the Laboratoire des Solides Irradiés at the École Polytechnique.

Education and career
Reining studied physics at RWTH Aachen University beginning in 1980, with 
Ivan Egry as a faculty mentor, earning a diploma there in 1985. She did her doctoral studies with Rodolfo Del Sole at the University of Rome Tor Vergata, completing her Ph.D. in 1991.

After a Marie-Curie postdoctoral fellowship at the Centre Européen de Calcul Atomique et Moléculaire in Orsay, Reining became a researcher for the CNRS in 1992. She was promoted to director of research in 2002, and to director of research exceptional class in 2016.

Recognition
Reining won the CNRS Silver Medal in 2003. She was elected as a Fellow of the American Physical Society (APS) in 2007, after a nomination from the APS Division of Computational Physics, "for her fundamental contributions to ab initio computation of spectroscopic properties of solids, employing many-electron Green's function and time-dependent density functional approaches".

Selected publications

References

External links
Home page

1961 births
Living people
German physicists
German women physicists
Spectroscopists
RWTH Aachen University alumni
University of Rome Tor Vergata alumni
Research directors of the French National Centre for Scientific Research
Fellows of the American Physical Society